Vallis Bohr is a valley on the Moon stretching due south of the crater Einstein. This wide cleft has a length of about 80 kilometers, and is radial to the Mare Orientale impact basin further to the south.

Vallis Bohr is a chain of secondary craters from the Orientale impact to the south.

References

Bohr, Vallis